Hispophora is a genus of moths in the family Geometridae described by Anthonie Johannes Theodorus Janse in 1932.

Species
 Hispophora amica (Prout, 1915)
 Hispophora lechriospilota (Prout, 1922)

References

Geometridae